Mangatarere Stream is a small gravel-bed stream in central Wairarapa, New Zealand, that originates in the Tararua Ranges. It is located close to the township of Carterton and is the main tributary to the Waiohine River. The Waiohine flows into the Ruamahanga River, southeast of Greytown.

Eleven species of native freshwater fish and one native decapod (koura) have been recorded within the Mangatarere Stream catchment. Of the 11 fish species, four (longfin, eel, dwarf galaxias, lamprey and brown mudfish) are classified as threatened species by the Department of Conservation.  Koura are also classed as a threatened species.

The stream is also listed in Greater Wellington's Regional Freshwater Plan as a waterway with important trout habitat. It is considered by Fish and Game to be a valuable brown trout spawning and rearing stream in the Wellington region, and is recognised as important in maintaining the trout fishery of the entire Ruamahanga Catchment.

A Mangatarere Stream Catchment Water Quality Investigation was conducted by Greater Wellington Regional Council between 2008 and 2010 in response to concerns about poor water quality. The results of surface water quality sampling over September 2008 to August 2009, indicate a decline in water quality with distance down the Mangatarere Stream towards the Carterton Township.  Nutrient concentrations exceed the Australian and New Zealand Guidelines for aquatic ecosystems (commonly known as the ANZECC guidelines).

The investigation identified that the stream's status as an important trout fishery, and habitat for four species of threatened native fish, is being adversely affected by storm water and waste water discharge from Carterton township and from nutrient leaching and stock access by dairy and drystock farmers. Riparian planting of native vegetation along the stream is being encouraged to assist filtration of nutrients and provide shade for native aquatic biodiversity.

References

External links
Gw.govt.nz
Mfe.govt.nz
Gw.govt.nz/assets

Rivers of the Wellington Region
Rivers of New Zealand
Carterton, New Zealand